Punctoterebra is a genus of sea snails, marine gastropod mollusks in the subfamily Terebrinae of the family Terebridae, the auger snails.

Species
 Punctoterebra ambrosia (Melvill, 1912)
 Punctoterebra arabella (Thiele, 1925)
 Punctoterebra aubryi (Gargiulo & Terryn, 2018)
 Punctoterebra awajiensis (Pilsbry, 1904)
 Punctoterebra baileyi (Bratcher & Cernohorsky, 1982)
 Punctoterebra ballina (Hedley, 1915)
 Punctoterebra caliginosa (Deshayes, 1859)
 Punctoterebra castaneofusca (Thiele, 1925)
 Punctoterebra contracta (E. A. Smith, 1873)
 Punctoterebra coralmarensis Terryn, 2021
 Punctoterebra exiguoides (Schepman, 1913)
 Punctoterebra fuscotaeniata (Thiele, 1925)
 Punctoterebra illustris (Malcolm & Terryn, 2012)
 Punctoterebra isabella (Thiele, 1925)
 Punctoterebra japonica (E. A. Smith, 1873)
 Punctoterebra lineaperlata (Terryn & Holford, 2008)
 Punctoterebra lischkeana (Dunker, 1877)
 Punctoterebra livida (Reeve, 1860)
 Punctoterebra longiscata (Deshayes, 1859)
 Punctoterebra marquesana Terryn, Gori & Rosado, 2019
 Punctoterebra nitida (Hinds, 1844)
 Punctoterebra omanensis (Gargiulo, 2018)
 Punctoterebra paucincisa (Bratcher, 1988)
 Punctoterebra pellyi (E. A. Smith, 1877)
 Punctoterebra plumbea (Quoy & Gaimard, 1833)
 Punctoterebra polygyrata (Deshayes, 1859)
 Punctoterebra reperta Terryn & Fraussen, 2020
 Punctoterebra rosacea (Pease, 1869)
 Punctoterebra roseata (A. Adams & Reeve, 1850)
 Punctoterebra solangeae (Bozzetti, 2015)
 Punctoterebra souleyeti (Deshayes, 1859)
 Punctoterebra succincta (Gmelin, 1791)
 Punctoterebra swainsoni (Deshayes, 1859)
 Punctoterebra teramachii (R. D. Burch, 1965)
 Punctoterebra textilis (Hinds, 1844)
 Punctoterebra tiurensis (Schepman, 1913)
 Punctoterebra trismacaria (Melvill, 1917)
 Punctoterebra turrita (E. A. Smith, 1873)
 Punctoterebra turschi (Bratcher, 1981)
 Punctoterebra venilia (Tenison Woods, 1879)

References

 Oyama K. (1961). On some new facts of the taxonomy of Terebridae. Venus. 21(2): 176–189
 Terryn, Y. (2007). Terebridae: A Collectors Guide. Conchbooks & Natural Art. 59pp + plates.

External links
 Bartsch P. (1923). A key to the family Terebridae. The Nautilus. 37(2): 60-64
 Fedosov, A. E.; Malcolm, G.; Terryn, Y.; Gorson, J.; Modica, M. V.; Holford, M.; Puillandre, N. (2020). Phylogenetic classification of the family Terebridae (Neogastropoda: Conoidea). Journal of Molluscan Studies

Terebridae
Gastropod genera